Bin Bulaye Baraati is a 2011 Indian dark comedy film written by Praful Parekh and M.Salim and directed by Chandrakant Singh. The stars Aftab Shivdasani, Priyanka Kothari, Rajpal Yadav, Om Puri, Sanjay Mishra, Shakti Kapoor and Vijay Raaz in lead roles, with Shweta Tiwari featured in a cameo appearance and Mallika Sherawat and Shweta Bhardwaj appearing in song numbers. The film was released in India on 17 June 2011 and received mixed reviews.

Plot
Criminals Hazari (Sanjay Mishra) and Murari (Rajpal Yadav) rob the Police Commissioner's home, and Chetta Singh (Vijay Raaz) steal the car belonging to the Commissioner's wife, Kusum (Rati Agnihotri).  Meanwhile, AD (Aftab Shivdasani) elopes with Shreya (Priyanka Kothari), the niece of Police Sub-Inspector Pralay Pratap Singh (Om Puri). With each group is on the run for different reasons, they all end up in a vehicle stolen from crime boss Durjan Singh/Black Cobra (Gulshan Grover).  In the vehicle is a suitcase filled with Durjan's loot.

On the run from both gangsters and police, they group disguises themselves using fake police uniforms, and arrives in Madhavgarh village just in time to stop Loha Singh (Manoj Joshi) from committing a crime.  Believing them to be real law officials, the town's residents host a congratulatory feast in their honor. The group settles in comfortably among their new-found friends, but the Black Cobra tracks them down and plots their capture and death.

Cast
 Aftab Shivdasani as AD
 Priyanka Kothari as Shreya
 Shweta Tiwari as Rajjo/Rosie
 Rajpal Yadav as Murari
 Om Puri as Sub Inspector Pralay Pratap Singh
 Rati Agnihotri as Kusum / Kuki
 Shakti Kapoor as Ajay Prakash
 Gulshan Grover as Durjan Singh / Black Cobra
 Vijay Raaz as Chetta Singh
 Sanjay Mishra as Hazari
 Manoj Joshi as Loha Singh
 Mukesh Tiwari as Gajraj
 Hemant Pandey as Ranjeet
 Johnny Lever as Sajjan Singh / Badi Bi
 Dinesh Lamba as Havaldar
 Rocky Verma as Teeka Singh
 Neeraj Vora as Police Commissioner
 Shweta Keswani as ginni
 Razak Khan as Sajjan's Dance Teacher
 Mallika Sherawat as Shalu in a Special Appearance in Item song "Shalu Ke Thumke"

Production
It was announced February 2011 that Anand Raj Anand would be composing songs for the film. By March 2011 principle filming had commenced. In April 2011, it was released that actress Shweta Tiwari would have a lead role in the film, that she would replace Mallika Sherawat in singing some songs for the film, and that Sherawat would until be in the film, but as a dancer and not a singer. One of Tiwari's song pieces was shot a scene solo with the other actors not present, but the others were added to the scene in post-production.

Soundtrack

Reception

Critical response
The film received mixed response from critics. Mid-Day noted that "with a line-up of seasoned character actors known for their comic timings", the film could have been a "laugh ride", writing that the filmmaker's "felt their mere presence was enough to prop the film" allowing them to work with a "meandering script" that jumped "from one character to another" in a manner "bound to test the audience's patience".  They also chided the inane dialogues and referred to the film as "balderdash", and a "no-brainer... ...made purely for the 'aam janata' of the hinterland".

IndiaGlitz noted that through consideration of cast of established comic actors, there were certain "set expectations" for the film, in that viewers would not expect "a classic in the making" and would appreciate surrendering "to the antics of a dozen odd comic players on the screen."  They also noted that the entire first half of the film is spent establishing its characters and that the second half "is an unabashed copy of Sholay with a little bit of Tees Maar Khan added as well."  They concluded that "despite very low expectations" the film itself "turns out to be a barely passable affair".

Glamsham noted that with the film's multiple comedic actors and special songs it "clearly aims to be a complete masala film."  They also noted that with "a plethora of actors who are known to tickle your funny bone, one would have at least expected a few laughs" from the film, but that it instead "turns out to be a tedious watch and a test of your patience."  They wrote that the plot was unoriginal, the treatment was poor and the film's climax was both predictable and "totally uninspiring." They concluded that "Anand Raj Anand's music is passable. Johny Lall's cinematography is unimpressive. Pranav Dhiwar's editing is tacky."

Box office
Bin Bulaye Baraati had an average opening commercially, and collected a poor gross of 65 million in its opening weekend. Facing competition with the film Ready, Always Kabhi Kabhi and Double Dhamaal seems to be the official reason to why the film failed to do well at the box office. Its total gross was 130 million worldwide, and was declared a Disaster grosser worldwide by Box office India.

References

External links
 

2011 films
2010s action comedy-drama films
2010s crime comedy-drama films
Indian action comedy-drama films
Indian crime comedy-drama films
English-language Indian films
2010s Hindi-language films
Indian independent films
Films scored by Anand Raj Anand
Films scored by Sanjoy Chowdhury
2011 independent films